Jiang Bo may refer to:

 Jiang Bo (figure skater) (born 1992), Chinese male pair skater
 Jiang Bo (footballer) (born 1982), Chinese footballer
 Bo Jiang (fugitive) (born 1968), businessman on the FDA Most Wanted Fugitives list
 Bo Jiang (NASA researcher), contract researcher for NASA
 Jiang Bo (runner) (born 1977), female Chinese middle-distance runner